Franklin College was in Tennessee before the American Civil War. It was established by Tolbert Fanning in the Elm Crag section of southeastern Nashville, Tennessee where the international airport is now located. Its operations were disrupted when hostilities broke out during the Civil War. Enrollment had been between 100 and 130. Its students joined the Confederacy. The school burned around this time and it was relocated to Hope Institute nearby. William Lipscomb, David Lipscomb, Elisha G. Sewell, and T. B. Larimore trained at the college. The Tennessee Legislature incorporated the school. Agriculture was part of its curriculum and a farm was connected to the school. Minerva College was its sister school established in 1849 for female students

In 1844, Fanning placed an advertisement seeking professor to teach a path, science, and agriculture.

Fanning founded Franklin College in 1840. Notable alumni include David Lipscomb, T. B. Larimore, E. G. Sewell, E. W. Carmack, J. E. Scobey, Samuel R. Lowery. and William Lipscomb. Fanning served as president of the college until 1861.

Alumni
Andrew Jackson Caldwell
Joseph Buckner Killebrew
James D. Richardson
William Ruffin Cox
Robert Toombs
James B. Frazier

See also
Restoration Movement

Further reading
Franklin College and Its Influences by James E. Scobey (1906)

References

Educational institutions established in 1840
Universities and colleges in Nashville, Tennessee
Defunct universities and colleges in Tennessee
1840 establishments in Tennessee